Júlio Delamare (July 1, 1928 – July 11, 1973) was a Brazilian sports journalist who worked as a journalist and sports commentator for the newspaper O Globo for more than ten years and for the television network Rede Globo, where he was the first director of the sports department.

He died on Varig Flight 820, in France. The plane caught on fire, causing it to crash. The Júlio Delamare Aquatics Centre, situated in Rio de Janeiro, was named after him, five years after the accident that caused his death.

References 

1928 births
1973 deaths
People from Rio de Janeiro (city)
Brazilian sports journalists
Victims of aviation accidents or incidents in France
Victims of aviation accidents or incidents in 1973